Paratya is a genus of freshwater shrimp of the family Atyidae, found in various islands in the Pacific Ocean. The split between the North Pacific clade (Japan) and the South Pacific clade (New Zealand, Australia, New Caledonia, Lord Howe Island) has been estimated to have occurred .

Species
There are 14 species recognised in the genus:

Paratya annamensis Balss, 1924
Paratya australiensis Kemp, 1917
Paratya boninensis Satake & Cai, 2005
Paratya borealis Volk, 1938
Paratya bouvieri Roux, 1926
Paratya caledonica Roux, 1926
Paratya compressa (De Haan, 1844)
Paratya curvirostris (Heller, 1862)
Paratya howensis Roux, 1926
Paratya improvisa Kemp, 1917
Paratya intermedia Roux, 1926
Paratya martensi Roux, 1925
Paratya norfolkensis Kemp, 1917
Paratya typa Roux, 1926

References

External links

Atyidae
Freshwater crustaceans
Taxa named by Edward J. Miers